Elections to Ballymena Borough Council were held on 5 May 2011 on the same day as the other Northern Irish local government elections. The election used four district electoral areas to elect a total of 24 councillors.

Election results

Note: "Votes" are the first preference votes.

Districts summary

|- class="unsortable" align="centre"
!rowspan=2 align="left"|Ward
! % 
!Cllrs
! % 
!Cllrs
! %
!Cllrs
! %
!Cllrs
! % 
!Cllrs
! % 
!Cllrs
! %
!Cllrs
!rowspan=2|TotalCllrs
|- class="unsortable" align="center"
!colspan=2 bgcolor="" | DUP
!colspan=2 bgcolor="" | UUP
!colspan=2 bgcolor="" | TUV
!colspan=2 bgcolor="" | SDLP
!colspan=2 bgcolor="" | Sinn Féin
!colspan=2 bgcolor="" | Alliance
!colspan=2 bgcolor="white"| Others
|-
|align="left"|Ballymena North
|bgcolor="#D46A4C"|35.7
|bgcolor="#D46A4C"|3
|14.2
|1
|10.1
|0
|9.9
|1
|5.9
|0
|6.9
|1
|17.3
|1
|7
|-
|align="left"|Ballymena South
|bgcolor="#D46A4C"|51.2
|bgcolor="#D46A4C"|4
|14.9
|1
|14.0
|1
|12.4
|1
|5.7
|0
|0.0
|0
|1.8
|0
|7
|-
|align="left"|Bannside
|bgcolor="#D46A4C"|44.4
|bgcolor="#D46A4C"|2
|15.3
|1
|22.1
|1
|6.5
|0
|11.7
|1
|0.0
|0
|0.0
|0
|5
|-
|align="left"|Braid
|bgcolor="#D46A4C"|52.5
|bgcolor="#D46A4C"|3
|20.8
|1
|7.3
|0
|6.5
|0
|9.1
|1
|0.0
|0
|3.8
|0
|5
|-
|- class="unsortable" class="sortbottom" style="background:#C9C9C9"
|align="left"| Total
|45.7
|12
|16.4
|4
|13.6
|2
|8.6
|2
|8.3
|2
|1.7
|1
|5.7
|1
|24
|-
|}

Districts results

Ballymena North

2005: 3 x DUP, 2 x UUP, 1 x SDLP, 1 x Independent
2011: 3 x DUP, 1 x UUP, 1 x SDLP, 1 x Alliance, 1 x Independent
2005-2011 Change: Alliance gain from UUP

Ballymena South

2005: 5 x DUP, 1 x UUP, 1 x SDLP
2011: 4 x DUP, 1 x UUP, 1 x TUV, 1 x SDLP
2005-2011 Change: TUV gain from DUP

Bannside

2005: 3 x DUP, 1 x UUP, 1 x Sinn Féin
2011: 2 x DUP, 1 x TUV, 1 x UUP, 1 x Sinn Féin
2005-2011 Change: TUV gain from DUP

Braid

2005: 3 x DUP, 1 x UUP, 1 x SDLP
2011: 3 x DUP, 1 x UUP, 1 x Sinn Féin
2005-2011 Change: Sinn Féin gain from SDLP

References

Ballymena Borough Council elections
Ballymena